Barrington is the name of several places in Nova Scotia, a Canadian Atlantic province, and may refer to:

Districts and communities
Municipality of the District of Barrington, a large district municipality in Shelburne County on the southwestern tip of the province
Barrington, Nova Scotia (community), a rural community of about 4,000 people just east of the northern corner of Barrington Bay
Barrington Head, Nova Scotia, a community on a headland on the northern end of Barrington Bay, between the communities of Barrington and Barrington West
Barrington Passage, Nova Scotia, a community on the western side of Barrington Bay just north of Cape Sable Island and about 5 km south of Barrington West
Barrington West, Nova Scotia, a community west of Barrington Head

Geographical features
 Barrington Bay, a bay on the southwestern tip of the province including the waters off the north end of Cape Sable Island
 Barrington River (Nova Scotia), a river running from Barrington Lake to Barrington Bay

See also
 Barrington River (disambiguation)